Kurt Schmied (14 June 1926 – 9 December 2007) was a goalkeeper for First Vienna FC and Austria national football team.

International career
He made his debut for Austria in May 1954 against Wales. He represented Austria during the FIFA World Cup 1954 and again in 1958. He was a hero of the quarter-final game versus Switzerland in the 1954 finals where he played on despite suffering from a debilitating heatstroke in a game that is often remembered as the Hitzeschlacht von Lausanne, or Heat Battle of Lausanne, and remains notable for being the game with the most goals scored in World Cup final history (Austria won the game, 7-5). He earned 38 caps, no goals scored.

He died in Vienna in December 2007.

Honours
Austrian Football Bundesliga (1):
 1955

External links
Player profile - Austria Archive

Sources 
 Andrzej Gowarzewski "FUJI Football Encyclopedia - World Cup FIFA*part I*Biographical notes - Heroes of Mundials" ; GiA Katowice 1993

References

1926 births
2007 deaths
Footballers from Vienna
Austrian footballers
Austria international footballers
1954 FIFA World Cup players
1958 FIFA World Cup players
First Vienna FC players
FK Austria Wien players
Association football goalkeepers
Burials at Ottakring Cemetery